The Blue Seal is a 2010 Canadian action drama film directed by Mike Donis and starring John Kraft, Thomas Daniel, Warren Bain, and Alan A. Leyland. Set in the fictional rural town of Hontas, Ontario, Canada, it focuses on a socially awkward farmer, John Kraft, who is unwittingly a part of a criminal delivery organization. As he tries to break his ties with the delivery company, he degrades into a violent, evil person who must eventually find a way to return to his compassionate and good-natured self.

Development
The Blue Seal was inspired by a short film which was shot as a part of a 48-Hour Toronto Film Challenge in June 2006. Inspired by the response to their short, Mike Donis, Aaron Tsang and Marsha Courneya decided to start writing a feature-length version, using the storyline of the short film as the introduction to the feature.

Awards
The Blue Seal won runner up for two 2010 Action On Film International Film Festival awards. Breakout Male Action Star (John Kraft) and Best Action Sequence, and was nominated for Best Score (Aaron Tsang).

References

External links 
 
 

2010 films
English-language Canadian films
Canadian action drama films
2010 action drama films
2010s English-language films
2010s Canadian films